Myrmica gallienii is an ant species distributed from Central Europe to West Siberia. Also found in Sweden, Finland, Hungary, Bulgaria and Romania. It lives in wet grasslands and swamps, often in saline land. It builds shallow nests with a soil mound in moist habitats but deep nests in sandy areas. Colonies are relatively large with thousands of individuals.

References
 Csősz S, Markó B, Gallé L 2011. The myrmecofauna (Hymenoptera: Formicidae) of Hungary: an updated checklist North-Western Journal of Zoology 7: 55–62.
 Czekes Z et al. 2012. The genus Myrmica Latreille, 1804 (Hymenoptera: Formicidae) in Romania: distribution of species and key for their identification Entomologica romanica 17: 29–50.

External links

Hymenoptera of Europe
Myrmica
Insects described in 1920